WJSG (104.3 FM) is a radio station licensed to Hamlet, North Carolina, United States.  The station is owned by Jackson Broadcasting Company.

History
The station went on the air as WSJG on May 3, 1991. On July 31, 1991, the station changed its call sign to the current WJSG.

The original format was Christian country music.

References

External links

JSG